"Friday's Child" is a song by Australian recording artist Wendy Matthews. It was released in January 1993 as the second single form Matthew's second studio album, Lily. The song peaked at number 15 on the ARIA Charts.

At the ARIA Music Awards of 1994, it won Best Female Artist.

Track listing
 "Friday's Child" - 4:01
 "So Tell Me How" - 5:00
 "Goin' Back to My Roots" - 5:43
 "La Jour ou tu est Partis (The Day You Went Away)" - 4:36

Charts

References

1993 singles
1992 songs
Wendy Matthews songs
ARIA Award-winning songs
Song recordings produced by T Bone Burnett